Bertrand Marcel Nicolas Baguette (born 23 February 1986) is a Belgian professional racing driver. In 2013, he won the 24 Hours of Le Mans in the LMP2 class and the FIA WEC LMP2 class title. In 2017, he won the final running of the Suzuka 1000km in Super GT. Bertrand is the 2022 Super GT 500 Champion with Nissan.

Career

Karting
Aged 14, Baguette began karting in his inter-provincial championship, driving "Blue" class karts, in which he finished fifth. He then moved up to junior level for 2001, competing again in the inter-provincial championship but also competed in the national championship for the first time. He finished third in the provincial level championship, but was four places lower in the national. Baguette competed in four different Intercontinental A class championships in 2002, with a runner-up position at the provincial level, despite competing in only certain events, due to prior higher-ranked commitments in the Belgian, French or European championships. He then completed in a fourth year of karting, winning the Belgian Championship and again finished runner-up in a partial campaign in the provincial championship. He also won a scholarship to give him a drive in 1600cc Formula Renault Belgium.

Formula Renault
Baguette moved into single seater racing in 2004. He entered in the Belgian Formula Renault 1600cc with Marc Goossens Motorsport that year, as part of his scholarship win. He finished a strong third in the championship, amassing three wins and four poles during the season.

The next season, Baguette moved to both Eurocup Formula Renault 2.0 and French Formula Renault 2.0 championships with Epsilon Euskadi. He finished eighth (tied on points with seventh Junior Strous) in the European championship and eleventh in the French one, including a second place at Pau. He continued in both series in 2006 with a fourth place overall in the Eurocup, including five podiums and a win at Le Mans, finishing just 11 points behind championship winner Filipe Albuquerque. He finished in eighth in the French championship, again for Epsilon Euskadi.

In 2007, Baguette entered the 3.5-litre Formula Renault 3.5 Series with the eponymous Kurt Mollekens-run KTR team, in which he took two podium finishes in his first season. He was close to win his first race in this category at Autodromo Nazionale Monza before a blown tyre. He continued in the category in 2008, driving for the Italian team Draco with which he scored his first win at Spa and ended seventh in the championship.

Baguette continued with Draco for the 2009 season. A steady start, with four podiums, left Baguette tied on points with Marcos Martínez before the Silverstone meeting. During the second half of the season, Baguette raised his rhythm to put himself with an unassailable 34-point championship lead with a round to go. Baguette eventually won both races of the last meeting of the season at Ciudad del Motor de Aragón, thus winning the championship by 57 points from Fairuz Fauzy. During his 2009 campaign, Baguette scored fives wins and ten podiums.

As a prize for his championship win, he was given the opportunity to test the Renault R29 Formula One car at Jerez on 1 December 2009. He also tested the BMW Sauber F1.09 car on 3 December.

IndyCar Series

On 22 March 2010, Conquest Racing announced that Baguette would drive their second car in the IndyCar Series, starting with the Indy Grand Prix of Alabama on 11 April.

Baguette qualified 24th for the 2010 Indianapolis 500 and finished 22nd after losing several laps in the pits to replace a rear-view mirror that had fallen off.

With some strong performances throughout the season, especially on ovals, he manage a best finish of 10th at Kentucky, after qualifying 6th.

Due to a lack of budget, Baguette couldn't get a full-time seat for the 2011 IndyCar Series. However, he could find a deal with Bobby Rahal's team Rahal Letterman Lanigan Racing to enter the 2011 Indianapolis 500 with the No. 30 car. After showing an impressive pace during practice, Baguette qualified on the fifth row for his second Indy 500. During the race, he was constantly positioned within the first half of the field and on lap 189, manage a pass on Danica Patrick to take the lead of the 2011 Indianapolis 500. His race engineer gambled on the race strategy by extending his time out on track, hoping for a late yellow flag that would have given the car a good chance at the win, but this didn't happen and low on fuel, Baguette had to pit three laps before the end of the race. He finished 7th, still his best result of his career in IndyCar.

Formula One
Baguette tested for Renault F1 at Jerez on 1 December 2009 and for BMW Sauber two days later. Baguette was favourite to become Robert Kubica's team mate at Renault after many favourites such as Timo Glock, Heikki Kovalainen, Romain Grosjean, Takuma Sato, Nick Heidfeld, Christian Klien and Jacques Villeneuve dropped out but the seat was eventually filled by Vitaly Petrov.

FIA World Endurance Championship

For 2013, Baguette was hired by OAK Racing to drive Morgan-Nissans in the LMP2 class on the FIA World Endurance Championship. Baguette shares the number 35 entry with co-drivers Ricardo González and Martin Plowman.

The 2013 season started at the 6 Hours of Silverstone, the OAK Racing Morgan LMP2-Nissan No. 35 finished in fourth place (twelfth overall) to get their first 10 points for the World Championship.

On the 6 Hours of Spa-Francorchamps, González, Baguette and Plowman finished in third position (for cars registered for points in the FIA World Endurance Championship), of LMP2 class (eleventh overall).

In 2013 Baguette and his co-drivers Ricardo González and Martin Plowman from OAK Racing Morgan LMP2-Nissan team, won 81st edition of the 24 Hours of Le Mans in LMP2 class (seventh overall). Their Morgan LMP2 covered a total of 329 laps in the Circuit de la Sarthe, the race was run in very difficult weather conditions and several serious accidents bringing out a record of twelve safety car caution periods.

The 6 Hours of São Paulo were held at the Autódromo José Carlos Pace, on 30 August–1 September. González, Baguette and Plowman got the second place of LMP2 category, only behind Oreca 03-Nissan team (Rusinov, Martin and Conway). With this result the Belgian driver got his second podium of the year.

In the fifth round of 2013 season were the 6 Hours of Circuit of the Americas in Austin, Texas on 20–22 September. González, Baguette and Plowman obtained the seventh place of LMP2 category (eleventh overall).

On 18–20 October, in the 6 hours of Fuji, following a two-hour delay the race was restarted once more under the safety car, lapping another eight circuits before officials stopped the race again and eventually called an end to the event. The No. 35 OAK Morgan-Nissan (Baguette, González and Plowman), started in the pole position and was declared the race winner of LMP2 class (fourth overall), in the same position they started. Due to difficult weather conditions half points will be awarded for all the teams and drivers in the event.

During the 6 Hours of Shanghai on 8–9 November, the No. 35 OAK Morgan-Nissan trio (Baguette, González and Plowman), qualified in fourth position and finished in third place (7th overall). With this new podium the French team extend their lead on 15 points to the final race of the championship.

On the last race of the season the 6 Hours of Bahrain on 29–30 November, González, Baguette and Plowman qualified in sixth place and finished in fourth position (sixth overall). Therefore, the Belgian Bertrand Baguette won the 2013 FIA WEC World Championship for drivers and teams in LMP2 class.

Super GT

In 2014, Baguette became a factory driver for Honda, and began competing in the Super GT championship in Japan. Between 2014 and 2018, he drove for the Epson Nakajima Racing team in the GT500 class, alongside co-driver Daisuke Nakajima from 2014 to 2016 and then Kosuke Matsuura during the 2017 and 2018 seasons. The team's Honda NSX-GT was the only GT500 car in the series equipped with Dunlop Tyres during these seasons, which were generally lacking performance compared to rival tyre manufacturers.

During his first season in the series in 2014, Baguette scored his first Super GT podium at the fifth round in Fuji Speedway. In 2017, Baguette and Matsuura drove the Epson Nakajima Racing Honda to victory at the Suzuka 1000km, considered as the biggest race in Japan. Moreover, 2017 was the last year the race was run as a 1000km event and part of the Super GT calendar.

For the 2019 season, Baguette was announced to drive the No. 17 Keihin Real Racing Honda NSX-GT equipped with Bridgestone tyres, partnering with Japanese driver Koudai Tsukakoshi. During the 2019 season, they scored two pole positions and one podium, but did not win a race.

Honda kept the two drivers for the next season. After scoring the fastest overall time of the pre-season tests in Okayama in March, the season was put on hold due to the coronavirus pandemic and Baguette returned to Belgium. Eventually, the 2020 season began in July, though Baguette nearly missed the season opener due to Japan's restrictions to let foreigners enter the country, but could obtain his visa just on time for the first race. The season was the best yet for Baguette, as he and Tsukakoshi managed to score two victories – at the second round at Fuji and fourth round at Motegi – and battled the whole season for the title. Both victories saw Baguette starting the race in second position and overtake the leader on track during his stint, before Tsukakoshi finished the job by driving to the finish without mistakes. The pair were leading the championship on countback going into the final round at Fuji, where ten teams could potentially win the title. The Real Racing NSX finished the race in fourth after a great comeback from a poor qualifying in which the No. 17 car could only manage twelfth position. This result saw Baguette and Tsukakoshi finish third in the championship, ten points behind the No. 100 Team Kunimitsu NSX driven by Naoki Yamamoto and Tadasuke Makino.

Baguette was retained at the Real Racing team for 2021, with the No. 17 Honda now sponsored by Astemo following the merger of Keihin into the company. The Belgian, still partnering Tsukakoshi, won the Fuji 500km race, the longest of the season, after starting only eleventh. The pair also managed to score another podium in Sugo together with two further top-five finishes. They entered the final round with a chance to win the championship, eight points off the lead, but early contact ended their race and they ultimately finished sixth in the standings.

After eight years that saw him earn four victories, seven podiums and two pole positions, Baguette announced he would leave Honda at the end of the 2021 season.

For the 2022 season, Baguette was signed by Nissan to drive for the famous Team Impul run by the legendary Kazuyoshi Hoshino. This move came after Nobuharu Matsushita made the exact opposite way around, taking the vacant seat left by Baguette on the n°17 Real Racing Honda. 2022 would also see the brand new Nissan 400Z taking part in Super GT's top class.
The combination of Team Impul, the new Nissan Z, Baguette and his teammate Kazuki Hiramine proved to be a great succes as they managed to lead the Calsonic-liveried n°12 Nissan to the Super GT title. This crown was the first for Hoshino's legendary squad since 1995. During all season, the pair fought at the top of the field, scoring 4 podiums, with one of them being an incredible victory in the 5th round at Suzuka that saw Baguette and Hiramine starting deadlast on the grid, overtaking the n°17 Astema NSX for the lead with only 3 laps to go.
Eventually, the Calsonic Z was crown champion with 70.5 points, 4.5 points ahead of the n°3 Nismo Z of Katsumasa Chiyo & Mitsunori Takaboshi.
This title was the first for Bertrand Baguette after nine season competing in Super Gt GT500 class.

For the 2023 season, Nissan announced an unchanged lineup, with Baguette and Hiramine retained to defend their title, now driving the n°1 Calsonic Z.

Super Formula
Baguette competed in the high-level Japanese Super Formula championship in 2015 and 2016, alongside his programme in Super GT. He drove a Honda-powered car for Nakajima Racing, scoring a best result of fifth in the final race of the 2016 season at Suzuka.

Racing record

Career summary

Complete Formula Renault 3.5 Series results
(key) (Races in bold indicate pole position) (Races in italics indicate fastest lap)

Superleague Formula
(Races in bold indicate pole position) (Races in italics indicate fastest lap)

IndyCar Series results
(key)

Indianapolis 500

Complete GT1 World Championship results

Complete European Le Mans Series results

24 Hours of Le Mans results

Complete FIA World Endurance Championship results

Complete Super GT results
(key) (Races in bold indicate pole position) (Races in italics indicate fastest lap)

‡ Half points awarded as less than 75% of race distance was completed.

Complete Super Formula results
(key) (Races in bold indicate pole position) (Races in italics indicate fastest lap)

References

External links

Belgian Formula Renault 1.6 drivers
French Formula Renault 2.0 drivers
Formula Renault Eurocup drivers
Belgian racing drivers
Super Formula drivers
World Series Formula V8 3.5 drivers
Superleague Formula drivers
IndyCar Series drivers
Indianapolis 500 drivers
Living people
Belgian expatriates in the United States
1986 births
24 Hours of Le Mans drivers
FIA World Endurance Championship drivers
Blancpain Endurance Series drivers
International GT Open drivers
Super GT drivers
24 Hours of Spa drivers
People from Verviers
Sportspeople from Liège Province
Draco Racing drivers
Conquest Racing drivers
Rahal Letterman Lanigan Racing drivers
OAK Racing drivers
Nakajima Racing drivers
KTR drivers
Nismo drivers
Epsilon Euskadi drivers
W Racing Team drivers
Lamborghini Squadra Corse drivers